George Philip Willis, Baron Willis of Knaresborough (born 30 November 1941, Burnley) is a politician in the United Kingdom. He is a Liberal Democrat member of the House of Lords, and was Member of Parliament (MP) for Harrogate and Knaresborough from 1997 until retiring at the 2010 general election. Up to that date he was the chair of the House of Commons Science and Technology Committee.

Early life
He attended Burnley Grammar School and the City of Leeds and Carnegie College, where he gained a Cert Ed in 1963. From 1963 to 1965 he was a teacher at Middleton County Secondary Boys' School; Head of History at Moor Grange County Secondary Boys' School from 1965 to 1967; Senior Master at Primrose Hill High School, Mabgate, from 1967 to 1974; and Deputy Head at West Leeds Boys' Grammar School from 1974 to 1978. In 1978, he gained a BPhil in Education from the University of Birmingham. Moving from Leeds to Teesside, he was Head Teacher of Ormesby School in Netherfields from 1978 to 1982, then moved back to Leeds to become Head Teacher of John Smeaton Community High School in Pendas Fields from 1983 to 1997.

Parliamentary career
He was first elected in 1997, beating Norman Lamont, the former Chancellor of the Exchequer, and was re-elected with increased majorities in 2001 and 2005. In May 2007 announced his decision to step down as an MP at the next general election, although he said that he would have stood again if a snap election had been called.

From 1999 to 2005, Willis was the Liberal Democrat Shadow Education and Skills Secretary, having previously served as Higher Education spokesman and acting spokesman on Northern Ireland. Following the 2005 general election, he was appointed chair of the House of Commons Science and Technology Committee, succeeding Labour's Ian Gibson.

In 2006, he stated that he would force an election for the party leadership by standing if there would otherwise be only one candidate. As two further candidates came forward to challenge the eventual winner, Sir Menzies Campbell, Willis did not stand. Campbell's victory left a vacancy for the post of deputy leader. Willis considered running in the deputy leadership election but did not submit a nomination.

At the Liberal Democrat Federal Conference in Spring 2007 (held in his home seat of Harrogate) he proposed a change to official Liberal Democrat policy on the future of Trident in an amendment to commit the party to getting rid of Britain's nuclear deterrent. The amendment was opposed by the party leadership and, in one of the closest votes in recent years at a Federal Conference, the amendment was defeated by 454 votes to 414.

In September 2008, Mr Willis provoked the resignation of Professor Michael Reiss from his position as Director of Education at the Royal Society (on secondment from the Institute of Education).  Professor Reiss, in a speech to the British Association for the Advancement of Science, had commented that in his experience as a teacher, children with creationist views were difficult to persuade otherwise, and that merely silencing them didn't cause them to change their minds at all. He suggested an alternative approach:  that such pupils should be allowed to express their opinions, not as science, but as 'a world view'. This would provide the opportunity for real discussion and science teaching. Willis demanded action by the Royal Society against Professor Reiss, so stimulating a furore which concluded with Reiss' resignation on 17 September.

Peerage
On 18 June 2010, Willis was created a life peer with the title Baron Willis of Knaresborough, of Harrogate in the County of North Yorkshire and was introduced in the House of Lords on 7 July 2010.

Personal life
He is a keen supporter of Burnley Football Club. He married Heather Sellars in 1974 in Staincliffe. They have a daughter Rachel (born 1975) and a son (born 1980). His daughter Rachel is a television personality best known for her role of Connie, the so-called "AOL lady" in the AOL adverts, a role which she played from 1998 to 2003. Although from Burnley, he has lived in the Yorkshire area for many years.

References

External links
 Phil Willis MP profile at the site of Liberal Democrats
 ePolitix.com – Phil Willis MP
 Guardian Unlimited Politics – Ask Aristotle: Phil Willis MP
 TheyWorkForYou.com – Phil Willis MP
 The Public Whip – Phil Willis MP voting record
 BBC News – Phil Willis profile 10 March 2006

News items
 Telegraph May 2009

1941 births
People from Burnley
People educated at Burnley Grammar School
Liberal Democrats (UK) MPs for English constituencies
Living people
UK MPs 1997–2001
UK MPs 2001–2005
UK MPs 2005–2010
Politics of the Borough of Harrogate
Alumni of Leeds Beckett University
Alumni of the University of Birmingham
Liberal Democrats (UK) life peers
Life peers created by Elizabeth II